This is an indexed list of the uniform and stellated polyhedra from the book Polyhedron Models, by Magnus Wenninger.

The book was written as a guide book to building polyhedra as physical models. It includes templates of face elements for construction and helpful hints in building, and also brief descriptions on the theory behind these shapes. It contains the 75 nonprismatic uniform polyhedra, as well as 44 stellated forms of the convex regular and quasiregular polyhedra.

Models listed here can be cited as "Wenninger Model Number N", or WN for brevity.

The polyhedra are grouped in 5 tables: Regular (1–5), Semiregular (6–18), regular star polyhedra (20–22,41), Stellations and compounds (19–66), and uniform star polyhedra (67–119). The four regular star polyhedra are listed twice because they belong to both the uniform polyhedra and stellation groupings.

Platonic solids (regular convex polyhedra) W1 to W5

Archimedean solids (Semiregular) W6 to W18

Kepler–Poinsot polyhedra (Regular star polyhedra) W20, W21, W22 and W41

Stellations: models W19 to W66

Stellations of octahedron

Stellations of dodecahedron

Stellations of icosahedron

Stellations of cuboctahedron

Stellations of icosidodecahedron

Uniform nonconvex solids W67 to W119

See also 
 List of uniform polyhedra
 The fifty nine icosahedra
 List of polyhedral stellations

References
 
 Errata
 In Wenninger, the vertex figure for W90 is incorrectly shown as having parallel edges.

External links
 Magnus J. Wenninger
 Software used to generate images in this article:
 Stella: Polyhedron Navigator Stella (software) - Can create and print nets for all of Wenninger's polyhedron models.
 Vladimir Bulatov's Polyhedra Stellations Applet
 Vladimir Bulatov's Polyhedra Stellations Applet packaged as an OS X application
 M. Wenninger, Polyhedron Models, Errata: known errors in the various editions.

Polyhedra
Polyhedral stellation
Mathematics-related lists